Lee Calvin White (September 1, 1923 – October 31, 2013) was an advisor to both President Kennedy and Johnson, most notably on civil rights matters.

Early life and education
White studied electrical engineering at the University of Nebraska graduated with a B.S. White then began studying law at the University of Nebraska College of Law graduating with his L.L.B.

Career
White worked as an attorney for the Tennessee Valley Authority. From 1954 to 1957, and then from 1958 to 1961, he was assistant to Senator John F. Kennedy. From 1961 to 1963 he was Assistant Special Counsel to President Kennedy. From 1963 to 1966 he was Associate Special Counsel, and then
Special Counsel, to President Johnson. From 1966 to 1969 he was Chairman of the Federal Power Commission.

According to historian Robert Dallek, although he was "not overtly or dramatically evident as a public figure, he worked behind the scenes in an effective way to deliver on executive reforms or actions." He was instrumental in pushing through Congress the Voting Rights Act of 1965.

In popular culture

In the 2014 film Selma, he was played by Giovanni Ribisi.

References

External links

 
 

|-

1923 births
2013 deaths
Advisors
Federal Power Commission
Kennedy administration personnel
Lyndon B. Johnson administration personnel
Nixon administration personnel
University of Nebraska College of Law alumni